Los Gabriel… Simplemente Amigos (English The Gabriel... Simply friends) is a compilation album by the Mexican singers Ana Gabriel and Juan Gabriel. It was released in 2007 under the label of Sony BMG Latin.

Track listing
Tracks:
 Quién Como Tú - Ana Gabriel
 Querida - Juan Gabriel
 Ay Amor - Ana Gabriel
 Te lo Pido Por Favor - Juan Gabriel
 Ni un Roce (Nem un Toque) - Ana Gabriel
 Siempre en Mi Mente - Juan Gabriel
 Simplemente Amigos - Ana Gabriel
 Que Lástima! - Juan Gabriel
 Es el Amor Quien LLega - Ana Gabriel
 He Venido a Pedirte Perdón - Juan Gabriel
 Evidencias - Ana Gabriel
 Inocente de Ti - Juan Gabriel
 Luna - Ana Gabriel
 Pero que Necesidad - Juan Gabriel
 Huelo a Soledad - Ana Gabriel
 Hasta que Te Conoci - Juan Gabriel

Album charts

 Note: This release reached the #4 position in Billboard Latin Pop Albums staying for 49 weeks and it reached the #9 position in the Billboard Top Latin Albums staying for 3 weeks in the chart.

References 

Ana Gabriel compilation albums
Juan Gabriel compilation albums
2007 compilation albums